Bolivia is an album by the American trumpeter Freddie Hubbard, released on the Music Master label in 1991. It features performances by Hubbard, Ralph Moore, Vincent Herring, Cedar Walton, David Williams, and Billy Higgins.

Reception

The Los Angeles Times wrote that the title track "sashays back and forth between a undulating Latin feeling and a driving swing section."

The AllMusic review by Scott Yanow states that "overall the music is satisfying enough to make this a recommended disc to fans of the modern mainstream."

Track listing 
All compositions by Freddie Hubbard except as indicated
 "Homegrown" – 8:41
 "Bolivia" (Walton) – 6:54
 "God Bless the Child" (Arthur Herzog Jr., Billie Holiday) – 6:31
 "Dear John" – 7:30
 "Managua" – 10:00
 "Third World" – 8:11

Personnel 
 Freddie Hubbard – trumpet
 Vincent Herring – alto saxophone
 Ralph Moore – tenor saxophone
 Cedar Walton – piano
 David Williams – bass
 Billy Higgins – drums

References 

Freddie Hubbard albums
1991 albums